Sir Thomas Esmonde, 9th Baronet (10 December 1786 – 31 December 1868) was an Irish Whig politician.

Esmonde was the son of John Esmonde and Helen née O'Callan. He first married Mary Payne, daughter of E. Payne in 1812, and after her death in 1840, remarried to Sophia Maria Rowe, daughter of Ebenezer Radford Rowe, in 1856. Neither wife bore his children.

He succeeded to the Baronetcy of Ballynastragh in 1803 upon the death of Sir Thomas Esmonde, 8th Baronet. Upon his own death in 1868, the title was inherited by Sir John Esmonde, 10th Baronet.

He was a member of the Reform Club and was, at some point, appointed a Privy Counsellor.

References

External links
 

UK MPs 1841–1847
Whig (British political party) MPs for Irish constituencies
Baronets in the Baronetage of Ireland
1786 births
1868 deaths
Members of the Privy Council of the United Kingdom
Esmonde family